Östersunds IK is a Swedish professional ice hockey club from Östersund.  The club was founded in 1965 and has played 21 seasons in Sweden's second-tier hockey league.  In 2003, the club transferred its A-team to Jämtland Hockey and played three years under that name while Östersunds IK was left with only its youth hockey programs.  Then in 2006, Östersunds IK merged with Brunflo IK and took over Jämtland Hockey's position in Division 1.

On 29 April 2022, the club was promoted to the HockeyAllsvenskan, the second tier of Swedish ice hockey, for first time, after winning the HockeyEttan playoffs. The would make their Allsvenskan debut in the 2022–23 season.

References

External links
Official website
Club profile on Eliteprospects.com

Ice hockey teams in Sweden
Sport in Östersund
1965 establishments in Sweden
Ice hockey clubs established in 1965
Ice hockey teams in Jämtland County
HockeyAllsvenskan teams